Lana Popadić (born 24 April 1983) is a former professional tennis player from Croatia.

Tennis career
Popadić is most noted for her performance at the 2004 Copa Colsanitas Seguros Bolivar, a WTA Tour tournament held in Bogota. Going into the event with a ranking of 235, Popadić won her way through qualifying, then had wins in two main-draw matches, over world No. 61 Arantxa Parra Santonja and Antonella Serra Zanetti of Italy. She was beaten in the quarterfinals by second seed María Sánchez Lorenzo in three sets.

Most of her career was played on the ITF circuit and she won one title in 2001, the doubles of a $10,000 tournament in Athens, where she was also runner-up in the singles that year. She never made a Grand Slam main draw but participated in the qualifying draws for the Australian, French and US Opens. In 2005, she retired from professional tennis.

She now works as a lawyer in Zagreb as owner at Odvjetnički ured Lana Popadić Katić.

ITF finals

Singles (0–1)

Doubles (1–3)

References

External links
 
 

1983 births
Living people
Croatian female tennis players